The 15th Busan International Film Festival was held from October 7 to October 15, 2010, at the Busan Stadium Yachting Center Outdoor Stage, hosted by actors Jung Joon-ho and Han Ji-hye.

A total of 308 films from 67 countries were screened in 6 theaters, with a record 103 world premieres and 52 international premieres. The festival had a total attendance of 182,046.

During the event, festival director Kim Dong-ho announced the construction of the Busan Cinema Center, which will be the main venue of the festival in the future. Kim also announced his own retirement, having served as director since the festival was founded in 1996.

Program
† World premiere
†† International premiere

Opening Film

Gala Presentation

A Window on Asian Cinema

New Currents

Korean Cinema Today - Panorama

Korean Cinema Today - Vision

Korean Cinema Retrospective

All That She Allows : Star, Actress, and Jimi Kim

World Cinema

Flash Forward

Wide Angle

Korean Short Film Competition

Asian Short Film Competition

Short Film Showcase

Documentary Competition

Documentary Showcase

Animation Showcase

Open Cinema

Special Program in Focus

Kurdish Cinema, The Unconquered Spirit

Subversive Imagination: The Spanish Masterpiece from Franco Regime

Czech Films Now: Cinema of Liberalism

A Tribute to Kwak Ji-kyoon: Portrait of Melodrama

Midnight Passion

Closing Film

Awards
New Currents Award
Bleak Night - Yoon Sung-hyun (South Korea)
The Journals of Musan - Park Jung-bum (South Korea)
Flash Forward Award - Pure - Lisa Langseth (Sweden)
Special Mention - Erratum - Marek Lechki (Poland)
BIFF Mecenat Award Asia
Miracle on Jongno Street - Lee Hyuk-sang (South Korea)
New Castle - Guo Hengqi (China)
FIPRESCI Award - The Journals of Musan - Park Jung-bum (South Korea)
NETPAC Award - Dooman River - Zhang Lu (China, South Korea)
KNN Award - My Spectacular Theatre - Lu Yang (China)

References

External links
Official site

Busan International Film Festival
Busan International Film Festival, 2010
Busan International Film Festival, 2010
Busan International Film Festival, 2010
2010 festivals in South Korea